Ludovic Delporte (born 6 February 1980) is a French retired footballer who played as a left midfielder.

Having played professionally in Spain (nine years, mainly with Osasuna) and in his own country (four), his later career was blighted by injuries.

Club career
Delporte was born in Sainte-Catherine, Pas-de-Calais. After an unassuming three-and-a-half-year spell at RC Lens which included a loan to Ligue 2 club Stade Lavallois, he moved, in January 2002, to Spanish Segunda División team Racing de Ferrol – still on loan – helping Albacete Balompié to achieve top-flight promotion the following season.

For the 2004–05 season, Delporte joined CA Osasuna, being an important attacking element in his first two years, including 27 games with three goals in the second as the Navarrese tied a best ever fourth-place in La Liga. In 2004–05's Copa del Rey final he started against Real Betis, setting up John Aloisi for the 1–1 equaliser (eventual 2–1 loss after extra time).

However, subsequently, Delporte would be severely hindered by injuries, totalling little more than 30 league appearances in four years, none whatsoever in the 2009–10 campaign. He was released in August 2010, aged 30.

Delporte stayed in Spain in August 2010, signing for second-tier Gimnàstic de Tarragona. After another season marred by physical problems he severed his ties to the Catalans, retiring shortly after.

On 20 December 2011, Delporte returned to active and signed a six-month deal with Angers SCO in his country's division two.

References

External links
 
 
 
 

1980 births
Living people
French people of Italian descent
Sportspeople from Arras
French footballers
Footballers from Hauts-de-France
Association football midfielders
Ligue 1 players
Ligue 2 players
Championnat National 2 players
RC Lens players
Stade Lavallois players
Angers SCO players
La Liga players
Segunda División players
Racing de Ferrol footballers
Albacete Balompié players
CA Osasuna players
Gimnàstic de Tarragona footballers
Competitors at the 2001 Mediterranean Games
Mediterranean Games medalists in football
Mediterranean Games bronze medalists for France
French expatriate footballers
Expatriate footballers in Spain
French expatriate sportspeople in Spain